Leonard Gerald "Leo The Lion" Labine (July 22, 1931 – February 25, 2005) was a Canadian professional ice hockey player. A native of Haileybury, Ontario, Labine played for teams in the NHL, WHL, EPHL, and the AHL. At 5'10", and 178 lbs, Labine had a long and varied career.  He played with the following teams during his lifetime:

 St. Michael's Majors from 1949 to 1950;
Barrie Flyers, with whom he won the Memorial Cup, from 1950 to 1951;
 Hershey Bears 1951 to 1953;
 Boston Bruins 1951 to 1961;
 Detroit Red Wings 1961 to 1962;
 Sudbury Wolves 1961 to 1962;
 Los Angeles Blades 1962 to 1967.

Leo Labine began his career as a featured member of the Memorial Cup winning Barrie Flyers, the Boston Bruins OHA affiliate. After a brief spell with the Hershey Bears of the American Hockey League, Labine joined the Bruins near the conclusion of the 1951–52 season and with his rugged, spectacular style, he quickly established himself as a regular.

In 1955 Labine won the Elizabeth C. Dufresne Trophy, given to the Boston Bruins player voted most outstanding during home games. Labine also led the Bruins in scoring for the 1954–55 season. His best campaigns in Boston were spent on Boston's top power unit with his long-time partner Real Chevrefils and smooth, crafty centre Don McKenney. His fiery, aggressive style fit in well with the Boston Bruins of the 1950s. Labine was traded to the Detroit Red Wings in 1961.

Labine, who retired from hockey in 1967, was also a member of the WHL All-Star Team in 1964, and participated in the NHL All-Star Games of 1955 and 1956. Labine played in a total of 643 NHL games, had 128 goals, and 321 points.

Labine died of cancer at the North Bay General Hospital in North Bay, Ontario, on February 25, 2005, at the age of seventy-three.  He is buried in St. Mary's Catholic Cemetery in North Bay.

Career statistics

Regular season and playoffs

References

External links
Hockey database profile

1931 births
2005 deaths
Barrie Flyers players
Boston Bruins players
Deaths from cancer in Ontario
Hershey Bears players
Sportspeople from Temiskaming Shores
Toronto St. Michael's Majors players
Ice hockey people from Ontario
Canadian ice hockey right wingers